Igreja de São Pedro  is a church in Portugal. It is classified as a National Monument.

Churches in Porto District
National monuments in Porto District